Michael "Mikey" Jones MBE (born 10 June 1994) is a British Paralympic swimmer classified as a S7 competitor for swimmers with physical disabilities. Jones competed at the 2016 Summer Paralympics in the 50 metre freestyle, 100 metre freestyle, and won gold in the 400 metre freestyle. He is coached by Mark Rose.

Early life
Michael Jones was born in Poole on 10 June 1994 with spastic diplegia, a type of cerebral palsy that primarily affects his legs. Jones began swimming at age 10, was a member of the New Milton Seagulls swimming club, and attended Mount Kelly School on a swimming scholarship. He attended Ballard School in New Milton, Hampshire before studying at Loughborough University.

Swimming career
After competing in the trials for the 2012 Summer Paralympics, Jones underwent three major surgeries and broke his leg that year.

In preparation for the 2016 Summer Paralympics, Jones began training at the Para-Swimming National Performance Centre in Manchester in September 2015. Despite pulling out of the IPC Swimming European Championships earlier that year due to injury, he competed in Rio de Janeiro in the 50 metre freestyle, 100 metre freestyle, and won gold in the 400 metre freestyle with a time of 4:45.78. Jones swam in the 2018 World Para Swimming European Championships, winning gold in the 400 metre freestyle. He is coached by Mark Rose. 

He was appointed Member of the Order of the British Empire (MBE) in the 2017 New Year Honours for services to swimming.

References

External links
 
 
 

1994 births
Living people
British male freestyle swimmers
S7-classified Paralympic swimmers
Paralympic swimmers of Great Britain
Paralympic gold medalists for Great Britain
Swimmers at the 2016 Summer Paralympics
Medalists at the World Para Swimming European Championships
Paralympic medalists in swimming
Medalists at the 2016 Summer Paralympics
Members of the Order of the British Empire
Swimmers at the 2022 Commonwealth Games
Commonwealth Games competitors for England
21st-century British people
People educated at Mount Kelly School